Benjamin Jefrey "Ben" Perry (born 7 March 1994) is a Canadian cyclist, who currently rides for UCI ProTeam .

Career
He was educated at Sir Winston Churchill Secondary School in St. Catharines where, prior to focusing on cycling, he also competed in cross country running. In September 2016 the  announced that Perry would join them on an initial two-year deal from 2017.

In November 2020, Perry signed with the  team for the 2021 season. The following season, Perry joined British Continental team .

Major results

2010
 1st  Junior race, National Cyclo-cross Championships
2012
 3rd Road race, National Junior Road Championships
2014
 1st  Road race, National Under-23 Road Championships
2015
 National Road Championships
1st  Criterium
1st  Under-23 road race
5th Road race
 1st Stage 5 Tour de Beauce
 1st  Mountains classification, Tour of Alberta
 7th Overall Grand Prix Cycliste de Saguenay
2016
 National Road Championships
1st  Under-23 road race
2nd Road race
 2nd Overall Grand Prix Cycliste de Saguenay
1st  Points classification
1st  Young rider classification
1st Stage 1
 7th Philadelphia International Cycling Classic
 10th Overall Joe Martin Stage Race
2017
 3rd Overall Baltic Chain Tour
1st Stage 2
2018
 1st  Mountains classification, Tour de Beauce
 2nd Road race, National Road Championships
 6th Overall Tour de Korea
2019
 2nd Overall Tour de Korea
1st Stage 3
 6th Rund um Köln
2022
 2nd Rapha Lincoln Grand Prix 
 3rd Road race, National Road Championships
 4th Overall Tour of Britain
 7th Overall Tour of Antalya

References

External links

1994 births
Living people
Canadian male cyclists
Sportspeople from St. Catharines